Jan Migdau (born 17 June 1958) is a Czech gymnast. He competed in eight events at the 1980 Summer Olympics.

References

External links
 

1958 births
Living people
Czech male artistic gymnasts
Olympic gymnasts of Czechoslovakia
Gymnasts at the 1980 Summer Olympics
People from Čáslav
Sportspeople from the Central Bohemian Region